Port Salerno is an unincorporated community and census-designated place (CDP) in Martin County, Florida, United States. The population was 10,401 at the 2020 census. It is part of the Port St. Lucie Metropolitan Statistical Area.

Geography
Port Salerno is located in eastern Martin County at  (27.144090, -80.191765). It is bordered to the north by the St. Lucie River and Indian River Lagoon, to the east by one of its branches, known as Great Pocket, to the northwest by Manatee Pocket, and to the southwest by U.S. Route 1.

History
In the 1920s, a small settlement was created in the southern shores of St. Lucie river inlet. It was named "Salerno" because of its visual resemblance to the Italian city of Salerno as observed by an early visitor. Early settlers were fisherman who lived along the banks of the Manatee Pocket, a small natural bay in the St. Lucie River. Some descendants of these original settlers remain in the area, with some families owning land for over 100 years.

The area increased in population and importance after World War II, with many people from the northeastern United States moving to Florida. In 1960, the name was changed to "Port Salerno", in order to differentiate it from that of the Italian city.

The 1967 film Gentle Giant was partially filmed in and around Port Salerno. The only grocery store in town was P.O. Smith's Grocery, which was housed in a small wooden building at the intersection of Snake Road (later renamed Salerno Road) and Route A1A. This grocery store was featured in the production in Palm Beach Gardens,  but had been transformed into a saloon before being filmed. This was because the grocery store had swinging "saloon style" doors.

In the 1970s, the Manatee Hotel was transformed into the Manatee Resort upon purchase by Michael Reynolds, heir to the R. J. Reynolds tobacco fortune. Sally Field mentioned the town and resort in an interview with Johnny Carson on The Tonight Show.

In the 1980s, the Chastain Campus of Indian River State College was established. Port Salerno is known for their "World Fishing Tournaments", based on the yacht port.

Government
Port Salerno is an unincorporated town located in Martin County, governed by County Commissioners. Martin County is divided into five districts. Port Salerno is represented by Sarah Heard as part of District 4.

Demographics

2020 census

As of the 2020 United States census, there were 10,401 people, 4,358 households, and 2,723 families residing in the CDP.

2000 census
As of the census of 2000, there were 10,141 people, 4,466 households, and 2,862 families residing in the CDP.

The racial makeup of the CDP was 88.50% White, 6.95% African American, 0.14% Native American, 0.68% Asian, 0.12% Pacific Islander, 2.27% from other races, and 1.34% from two or more races. Hispanic or Latino of any race were 8.16% of the population.

There were 4,466 households, out of which 23.2% had children under the age of 18 living with them, 50.9% were married couples living together, 9.3% had a female householder with no husband present, and 35.9% were non-families. 28.9% of all households were made up of individuals, and 13.9% had someone living alone who was 65 years of age or older.  The average household size was 2.25 and the average family size was 2.73.

In the CDP, the population was spread out, with 19.9% under the age of 18, 6.1% from 18 to 24, 24.7% from 25 to 44, 24.6% from 45 to 64, and 24.7% who were 65 years of age or older.  The median age was 44 years. For every 100 females, there were 92.8 males.  For every 100 females age 18 and over, there were 91.7 males.

The median income for a household in the CDP was $39,839, and the median income for a family was $45,016. Males had a median income of $32,420 versus $25,371 for females. The per capita income for the CDP was $24,948.  About 7.0% of families and 9.6% of the population were below the poverty line, including 15.9% of those under age 18 and 6.8% of those age 65 or over.

References

External links

Census-designated places in Martin County, Florida
Port St. Lucie metropolitan area
Populated places on the Intracoastal Waterway in Florida
Former municipalities in Florida
Census-designated places in Florida